Camp Funston is a U.S. Army training camp located on Fort Riley, southwest of Manhattan, Kansas. The camp was named for Brigadier General Frederick Funston (1865–1917). It is one of sixteen such camps established at the outbreak of World War I.

History

World War I
The Camp Funston garrison was administered by the 164th Depot Brigade, commanders of which included George King Hunter. Depot brigades were responsible for receiving, housing, equipping, and training enlistees and draftees, and for demobilizing them after the war.

During World War I, two divisions commanded by Major General Leonard Wood, totaling nearly 50,000 recruits, trained at Camp Funston. Notable units who received training at Camp Funston include the 89th Division, which was deployed to France in the spring of 1918, the 10th Division and black soldiers assigned to the 92nd Division.

During World War I, Camp Funston also served as a detention camp for conscientious objectors (COs) many of which were Mennonite in faith. Since it was compulsory, Hutterites sent their young men to military camps, but they did not allow them to obey any military commands or wear a uniform. 

In March 1918, some of the first recorded American cases of what came to be the worldwide influenza pandemic, also known as "Spanish flu", were reported at Camp Funston.

Correctional camp
Prior to October 1992, Camp Funston was the home of the United States Army Correctional Activity, formerly U.S. Army Retraining Brigade, whose mission was officially to prepare prisoners for transition to civilian life as useful citizens with General Discharges or, in a few select cases, for return to duty. The Correctional Brigade environment was unique in that prisoner control was maintained by military discipline, instead of walls and bars for most of the typical prisoners’ stay. The Correctional Brigade doctrine was that the minimum custody/military discipline environment when coupled with correctional treatment, educational programs, military and vocational training best prepared the typical first-time prisoner for a crime-free life after prison as either a productive soldier or a useful citizen in civilian life. Moreover, this correctional system was asserted to be less expensive to establish and operate than the traditional prison. The camp had a cinema that was open to the residents of Fort Riley, including those outside of Camp Funston.

Modern use
Camp Funston was the location where the training of all military transition teams for service in Iraq and Afghanistan takes place. Previously, transition teams had been trained at several U.S. Army installations, most notably Fort Carson, Colorado; Camp Atterbury, Indiana; Fort Hood, Texas; and Camp Shelby, Mississippi. However, in early 2006, the U.S. Army decided to consolidate all training at Fort Riley, Kansas, in order to standardize and improve training for that critical mission.

The first teams began training on June 1, 2006. The 1st Brigade, 1st Infantry Division took over command and control of the TT mission in October 2006. The brigade is responsible for the formation and training of the TT teams.  This mission shifted to Fort Polk, Louisiana later in 2009.

References

Further reading

External links

 The Great War Comes to Kansas
 29th Field Artillery WWI Photographs

Military facilities in Kansas
Spanish flu
Spanish flu monuments and memorials